A republic is a form of government.

Republic(s) or The Republic may also refer to:

Governments
 List of republics
 First Republic (disambiguation)
 Second Republic (disambiguation)
 Third Republic (disambiguation)
 Fourth Republic (disambiguation)
 Fifth Republic (disambiguation)
 Republic of Ireland, sometimes called "The Republic" to distinguish it from Northern Ireland or the island of Ireland
 Republic of South Africa
 Sixth Republic of South Korea
 Roman Republic
 United States of America, sometimes called "The Republic", especially in a classical sense
 Weimar Republic
 A term for federated states in some federations:
 Republics of the Soviet Union
 Republics of Russia
 Autonomous republic

Art, entertainment, and media

Writings
 Republic (Plato), a dialogue by Plato
 De re publica (The Republic), a dialogue by Cicero
 Republic (Zeno), a partially lost text by Zeno of Citium
 Republic, a lost text by Crates of Thebes
 Republic, a lost text by Diogenes of Sinope
 Six livres de la république or La République (Republic in English), a 1577 book by Jean Bodin

Fictional entities
 Galactic Republic, a form of interplanetary government in the Star Wars universe

Films
Republic (film), a 2021 Indian Telugu-language film
The Republic (film), 1998 Turkish film

Games
 Republic: The Revolution, a 2003 computer strategy game

Music

Artists
Republic (band), a Hungarian rock group
Republica, a British electronic/rock group

Albums
Republic (album), a 1993 New Order album
Republic? (album), a 2005 sHeavy album

News channels
Republic TV, an Indian English language news channel
Republic Bharat, and Indian Hindi language news channel

Periodicals
The Republic (Columbus, Indiana), a daily newspaper in Columbus, Indiana
The Republic (newspaper), a bi-weekly publication from Vancouver, Canada
The Arizona Republic, largest newspaper in Arizona

Sculpture
 Statue of the Republic, a statue in Jackson Park, Chicago

Places

United States
 Republic, Kansas
 Republic, Michigan
 Republic, Missouri
 Republic, Ohio
 Republic, Pennsylvania
 Republic, Washington
 Republic, West Virginia

Other countries
 Republic (peak), a mountain in Azerbaijan

Enterprises
 Republic (fintech), a crowdfunding platform
 Republic (retailer), a British clothing retailer
 Republic Pictures, an American movie and serial production company
 Republic Records, a subsidiary of Universal Music Group
 Republic Services, an American waste disposal company

Political advocacy
 Republic (Belarus), a parliamentary group
 Republic (political organisation), a British republican organisation
 Republic (Transnistria), a political party
 Republic (Latvia), a political party
 Republic (Slovakia), a political party

Transportation
Republic Airport, a general aviation airport in Long Island, New York
Republic Aviation, an American aircraft manufacturer notable for producing the P-47 Thunderbolt, the F-84 Thunderjet, and the F-105 Thunderchief
Republic Airlines refers to two companies
 Republic Airlines (1979–1986), a defunct airline purchased by Northwest Airlines that ceased operating in 1986
 Republic Airlines, a regional air carrier affiliated with US Airways
Republic Motor Truck Company, a manufacturer of commercial trucks based in Alma, Michigan circa 1913–1929
RMS Republic (1903), the second White Star liner to bear the name and the first ship ever to signal distress by wireless telegraphy; lost after colliding with the SS Florida
SS Republic (1853) (originally named SS Tennessee and named USS Mobile for a time), a ship lost in an 1865 hurricane with a large cargo of gold coins
SS Republic (1871), an Oceanic class liner of the White Star Line

See also

 
 
 Republica (disambiguation)
 Republican (disambiguation)
 République (disambiguation)
 Old Republic (disambiguation)
 New Republic (disambiguation)
 Republik, a Swiss news magazine